Only You is a 1994 American romantic comedy film directed by Norman Jewison and starring Marisa Tomei, Robert Downey Jr., and Bonnie Hunt. Written by Diane Drake and Malia Scotch Marmo (uncredited), the film is about a young woman whose search for the man she believes to be her soulmate leads her to Italy where she meets her destiny. Upon its release the film received mixed reviews, but critics praised Tomei and Downey's performances.

Plot
After playing with a Ouija board with her brother Larry, 11-year-old Faith Corvatch becomes convinced that her soul mate, the man she is destined to be with, is named "Damon Bradley." This belief is strengthened when a few years later a carnival fortune-teller tells her that "Damon Bradley" is the name of the man she will marry.

Fourteen years later, Faith is a teacher at a Catholic school and is engaged to a podiatrist. Ten days before the wedding, Faith learns that her fiancé's high-school classmate, Damon Bradley, is flying to Venice that day. Determined to meet him, Faith follows his trail with her sister-in-law, Kate, from Pittsburgh through Venice and the Italian countryside to a street-side restaurant in Rome, but they keep missing him.

Faith meets a young American, but has no interest until he identifies himself as Damon Bradley. They spend a romantic evening together and fall hopelessly in love. Then he reveals that his actual name is Peter Wright, so she angrily leaves him and prepares to fly back home. Meanwhile, a suave Italian businessman named Giovanni has been wooing Kate.

The next morning Peter tells Faith he searched for Damon overnight, discovering he has moved on to Positano. Giovanni offers to drive the three Americans there. At a posh hotel, Faith meets Damon, a good-looking playboy, and invites him to dinner. Peter spies on them until Damon makes unwelcome sexual advances on Faith. It turns out that this "Damon" really is a friend of Peter's who has helped stage the entire scene.

Back in the United States, Larry finds out that his wife, Kate, is in Italy. He travels there to find her while Kate and Faith are again planning to return home. Larry arrives in time to make up with Kate. He also reveals to her that he intentionally spelled out the name "Damon Bradley" on the Ouija board as a prank, and then paid the fortune-teller to tell Faith that her true love had the same name. He hadn't told her the truth because he feared she would never speak to him again.

Faith and Peter are at the airport when they hear Damon Bradley paged. At the information desk they finally meet Damon. Peter tells him why Faith has been following him, and also that he (Peter) is in love with her, then boards his flight home to Boston. Damon asks Faith if she loves Peter. She realizes that she does and rushes to join him on his plane. The airport staff delays the flight until she can board. She and Peter embrace and kiss as the passengers and crew applaud.

Cast
 Marisa Tomei as Faith Corvatch
Tammy Minoff as Young Faith Corvatch
 Robert Downey Jr. as Peter Wright
 Bonnie Hunt as Kate Corvatch
Jessica Hertel as Young Kate Corvatch
 Joaquim de Almeida as Giovanni
 Fisher Stevens as Larry Corvatch
Harry Barandes as Young Larry Corvatch
 Billy Zane as Harry / Fake Damon Bradley
 Siobhan Fallon as Leslie
 John Benjamin Hickey as Dwayne, Faith's Fiancé
 Adam LeFevre as Damon Bradley
 Barbara Cupisti as Anna
 Antonia Rey as Fortune Teller
 Phyllis Newman as Faith's Mother
 Denise Du Maurier as Dwayne's Mother
 Dina Morrone as Shoe Show Announcer

Production

Filming locations
 Chicago Studio City, 5660 W. Taylor Street, Austin, Chicago, Illinois, USA (747 mockup)
 Cinecittà Studios, Cinecittà, Rome, Lazio, Italy 
 Pittsburgh, Pennsylvania, USA 
 Positano, Salerno, Campania, Italy 
 Rome, Lazio, Italy 
 San Gimignano, Siena, Tuscany, Italy (where they run out of gas)
 Venice, Veneto, Italy 
 West Mifflin, Pennsylvania, USA

Filming locations in Rome included the piazza at the Basilica di Santa Maria in Trastevere, Tiber Island, the piazza and column outside San Bartolomeo all'Isola, the Pons Fabricius northeast of Tiber Island, Esquiline Hill, the Fountain of Neptune at Piazza Navona, and the fountain at the south end of Via del Mascherone near Via Giulia.

Filming locations also included the Hotel Le Sirenuse at via Cristoforo Colombo in Positano (where they meet Billy Zane's character at the pool) and the Hotel Danieli in Venice.

Reception

Critical response
Upon its theatrical release, Only You received mixed reviews. In his review in the Chicago Sun-Times, Roger Ebert gave the film three and a half out of four stars, calling it "an endangered species in today's Hollywood." 

Ebert singles out Tomei's performance as particularly noteworthy. 

In her review in The New York Times, Janet Maslin called the film "frankly touristy" and Jewison's directorial approach "cornball". Maslin was even less impressed with Tomei's performance, calling her "the least convincing actress ever to pretend to teach school." Maslin acknowledged Sven Nykvist's "picturesque" cinematography, Milena Canonero's "slinky, glamorous costumes", and Diane Drake's "rather sweet" screenplay.

In his review in The Washington Post, Desson Howe wrote, "Jewison directs Only You with sure, comic instinct." He singled out Bonnie Hunt's performance, noting, "Jewison's best asset of all is Hunt, an adroit comedian whose retorts and mannerisms—as she helps her friend along in this wacky mess—are priceless."

Howe's colleague at The Washington Post, Rita Kempley, was unimpressed with Tomei's performance:

In his review for Reel Views, James Berardinelli wote that Tomei and Downey "don't fully connect" and that the film is "entertaining without being exceptionally accomplished." Berardinelli called the film "essentially a light, inoffensive movie that will appeal to those who aren't seeking more than a bubbly romance."

In his DVD review for Movie.net, John J. Puccio wrote, "What every good romantic comedy demands are two beautiful people, usually of opposite sexes, beautiful scenery, beautiful music, and beautifully written situations. Never mind that director Norman Jewison's previous hit comedy, Moonstruck, didn't quite fit the mold. Only You does." Puccio called the film "one of the most charming films to come along since, well, since Moonstruck. On DVD it is beautiful just to look at. ... The scenery alone is worth the price of the DVD. The gorgeous photography and the crystal clarity of the images make widescreen viewing a must."

On Rotten Tomatoes, the film has an approval rating of 53% based on 36 reviews. Audiences surveyed by CinemaScore gave the film a grade A− on scale of A to F.

Box office
The film opened at #3 at the North American box office making $5,711,738 in its opening weekend, and grossed $20,059,210 in the United States.

Year-end lists 
 5th worst – Bob Strauss, Los Angeles Daily News

Soundtrack

The original soundtrack for Only You was released in 1994 by Columbia Records. The album contains original music by Rachel Portman, classical Italian music, and pop songs by Michael Bolton.

 "Only You (And You Alone)" by Louis Armstrong (3:12)
 "Written in the Stars" by Ezio Pinza (1:15)
 "Some Enchanted Evening" by Ezio Pinza (3:01)
 "I'm Coming with You" by Peter De Sotto and Quartetto Gelato (2:21)
 "Venice" by Peter De Sotto and Quartetto Gelato (1:51)
 "O Sole Mio" by Peter De Sotto and Quartetto Gelato (3:10)
 "La traviata: Libiamo Ne' Lieti Calici" by Agnes Baltsa, José Carreras, London Symphony Orchestra and Plácido Domingo, conductor (2:57)
 "Lost in Tuscany" by Quartetto Gelato (2:29)
 "Arriving at Damon's Restaurant" by Quartetto Gelato (1:39)
 "Running After Damon" by Quartetto Gelato (0:58)
 "Gypsy Blessing" by Quartetto Gelato (3:21)
 "Positano" by Quartetto Gelato (1:45)
 "Quartet in B flat major: Rondo, Tempo Di Minuetto" by Quartetto Gelato (4:54)
 "Do You Love Him?" by Quartetto Gelato (3:16)
 "Theme from Only You" by Quartetto Gelato (3:34)
 "Once in a Lifetime" by Michael Bolton (5:55)

The following additional music appeared in the film but does not appear on the soundtrack CD.
 "On the Beautiful Blue Danube" - Johann Strauss
 "Swing City" - Richard Iacona
 "Sloe Gin Fizz" - Richard Iacona 
 "Rondo" by Quartetto Gelato
 "Hallelujah Chorus" (George Frideric Handel) by Andrew Davis and The Toronto Symphony Orchestra
 "Amore Contro" by Eros Ramazzotti
 "Overture From La Forza Del Destino" - Giuseppe Verdi
 "Livin' in the Streets" by Kirk Whalum
 "Senza Perderci Di Vista" by Eros Ramazzotti

Novelization
A novelization was published in 1994 by Bantam Books, written by romance author Fayrene Preston.

Remake
A Chinese remake also titled Only You was released on July 24, 2015. It stars Tang Wei and Liao Fan.

References

External links

 
 
 

1994 films
1994 romantic comedy films
American coming-of-age comedy films
American romantic comedy films
1990s English-language films
Films about weddings
Films directed by Norman Jewison
Films scored by Rachel Portman
Films shot in Pittsburgh
Films set in the Amalfi Coast
Films set in Italy
Films set in Pittsburgh
Films set in Venice
Films set in Tuscany
Films set in Rome
Films set in the United States
Films shot in Rome
TriStar Pictures films
1990s American films